Hinderdam is a hamlet in the Dutch province of North Holland. It is a part of the municipality of Wijdemeren, and lies about 15 km southeast of Amsterdam.

Hinderdam consists of about 20 houses.

References

Populated places in North Holland
Wijdemeren